The North Country is the northernmost region of the U.S. state of New York, bordered by Lake Champlain to the east, the Adirondack Mountains and the Upper Capital District to the south, the Mohawk Valley region to the southwest, the Canadian border to the north, and Lake Ontario and the Saint Lawrence Seaway to the west. A mostly rural area, the North Country includes seven counties. Fort Drum, a U.S. Army base, is also located in the North Country, as is the Adirondack Park. As of 2009, the population of the region was 429,092.

The term "North Country" was first widely popularized within New York by the 1900 novel Eben Holden by Irving Bacheller.

Counties 

According to the Empire State Development Corporation, the North Country encompasses the following seven counties:

Clinton County
Essex County
Franklin County
Hamilton County
Jefferson County
Lewis County
St. Lawrence County

However, according to the Adirondack North Country Association, the North Country consists of 14 counties; those listed above and the following:

Fulton County
Herkimer County
Oneida County
Oswego County
Saratoga County
Warren County
Washington County

These are all counties in which part of Adirondack State Park resides.

Herb Hallas summarizes both views:

See also 
 Adirondack Park
 Ausable Chasm
 Fort Drum
 Thousand Islands
 Upstate New York
 Lake George

References

External links

 Development Authority of the North Country website, a New York state public benefit corporation
 Hudson River-Black River Regulating District website, a New York state public benefit corporation

Regions of New York (state)
Upstate New York